Allan Eleouet (born 29 July 1994) is a Swiss footballer who plays as a winger and forward for Tuzla City.

Career
Eleouet started his career with Swiss fifth tier side Baulmes. In 2015, he signed for Yverdon in the Swiss fourth tier, helping them achieve promotion to the Swiss second tier within 6 seasons. 

In 2022, Eleouet signed for Bosnia and Herzegovina club Tuzla City. On 7 August 2022, he debuted for Tuzla City during a 0–0 draw with Sloboda (Tuzla).

References

External links
  

1994 births
2. Liga Interregional players
Association football forwards
Association football wingers
Expatriate footballers in Bosnia and Herzegovina
FC Baulmes players
FC Bavois players
FK Tuzla City players
Living people
Swiss 1. Liga (football) players
Swiss Challenge League players
Swiss expatriate footballers
Swiss expatriate sportspeople in Bosnia and Herzegovina
Swiss men's footballers
Swiss Promotion League players
Yverdon-Sport FC players